State Highway 67 (SH 67) is a New Zealand state highway located in the northern parts of the South Island of New Zealand.  It is 51.2 km long usually on the coast and connects SH 6 with the settlement of Mokihinui. It used to be 96 kilometres long and ran the entire length of the road from Westport to Karamea  The highway and its spur serves the large West Coast town of Westport and lies entirely within the Buller District.

Route
SH 67 starts at SH 6 and proceeds in a northerly direction until the intersection with SH 67A. There the road turns right and crosses the Buller River to enter the township of Westport. Once in the CBD, the highway turns right and proceeds in an easterly direction until it crosses the Orowaiti River.

The road passes through alternating areas of farmland and temperate rainforest vegetation as it passes the settlements of Waimangaroa (turn right here for Denniston), Granity (turn right here for Millerton, Stockton and Stockton Mine), Ngakwau and Hector. Before Hector the road crosses the Ngakawau River.

Beyond Hector, the road acts as a frontier between the coastline and the adjoining hills until it reaches Waimarie and Summerlea, where it swings inland towards Mokihinui (turn here to Seddonville). After crossing the Mōkihinui River, the highway number officially terminates here but the road continues on towards Karamea with the red shield superseded by white shields as Regional Route 67.

Spur sections

State Highway 67A (SH 67A) is a spur of SH 67. It is 8.9 km long and connects Westport with the settlements of Carters Beach and Cape Foulwind, as well as the site of the former Holcim cement plant which closed in 2016.

Upgrade works 
In 2020, Waka Kotahi was allocated $2.5 million in funding to re-inforce State Highway 67 in the section between Granity and Ngakawau, as part of the New Zealand Upgrade Programme.  The funding is to allow strengthening works on bridge abutments as part of improving the resilience of the highway.

See also
List of New Zealand state highways
 New Zealand Travel Atlas, Pages 46 und 50, Wise Maps  Auckland

References

External links
 New Zealand Transport Agency

67